The following is a chronological list of Canadian recording artist, Avril Lavigne's promotional tours. For her concert tours, see List of Avril Lavigne concert tours.

Live by Surprise Tour

The Live by Surprise Tour was also called the Top Secret Mall Tour. It performed at malls in the United States and Canada. Lavigne showcased acoustic renditions of her previous hits and songs from her new set, Under My Skin (2004). Details of each location were not revealed until 48 hours before the event commenced.

Setlist

 "He Wasn't"
 "My Happy Ending"
 "Sk8er Boi"
 "Don't Tell Me"
 "Take Me Away"
 "Complicated"
 "Nobody's Home"

Tour dates

The Best Damn Thing Promotional Tour

The Best Damn Thing Promotional Tour reached North America, Europe and Asia, and supported her third studio album, The Best Damn Thing (2007). Lavigne performed at several music festivals in the United States, United Kingdom, Ireland, Germany and France. The premiere concert in Calgary was filmed for her first television special, "Avril Lavigne: Exclusive". The tour was filmed and broadcast on the Internet for several of the festivals in Europe. The trek ended a few months before the singer began her third concert tour.

Setlist

Tour dates

Festivals and other miscellaneous performances

See also
List of Avril Lavigne concert tours

References

Promotional tours
Lavigne, Avril